The Orchestra Conductor (and also known as The Conductor) is a 1980 Polish drama film directed by Andrzej Wajda. It was entered into the 30th Berlin International Film Festival, where Andrzej Seweryn won the Silver Bear for Best Actor. It was also shown at the 1980 New York Film Festival.

Cast
 John Gielgud - John Lasocki
 Krystyna Janda - Marta
 Andrzej Seweryn - Adam Pietryk
 Jan Ciecierski - Marta's Father
 Maria Seweryn - Marysia
 Józef Fryzlewicz - Governor
 Janusz Gajos - High Official
 Mary Ann Krasinski - Marta's Friend
 Anna Lopatowska - Anna
 Mavis Walker - Lilian
 Tadeusz Czechowski - Tadzio
 Marek Dabrowski - Official
 Stanislaw Górka - Bass Player
 Jerzy Kleyn
 Elzbieta Strzalkowska
 Jerzy Szmidt
 Wojciech Wysocki - Kwiatkowski
 Stanislaw Zatloka - Rysio

References

External links

1980 films
Polish-language films
English-language Polish films
1980 drama films
Films about classical music and musicians
Films directed by Andrzej Wajda
Films set in Poland
Films set in the United States
Polish drama films